M. V. Rajamma (10 March 1918 – 23 April 1999) was an Indian actress, producer and playback singer of films mostly in Kannada, Tamil and Telugu languages from the 1930s through 1970s. She has the distinction of having acted as both heroine and mother to stalwart South Indian actors such as Dr. Rajkumar, Sivaji Ganesan, MGR and NTR. Karnataka Government established M. V. Rajamma Award in her honor.

Making her debut as a lead actress in the 1936 released Samsara Nauka Rajamma enjoyed an elaborate career in feature films across South India. She was the first and foremost woman producer in South India and in Kannada films. She produced the film Radha Ramana in 1943 under her own home banner Vijaya Films. Her entry to the Tamil films was through the 1940 classic hit film Uthama Puthiran. She went on to star in about 60 Kannada, 80 Tamil, 20 Telugu and one Hindi films in her career spanning around four decades.

Early life
Rajamma was born in 1921 at Agandanahalli, a village in today's Bangalore Urban district, hitherto a part of Kingdom of Mysore. Her father Nanjappa, a merchant, was fond of stage and encouraged her to act. Rajamma joined the theatre group Chandrakala Nataka Mandali as a teenager and performed in plays alongside B. R. Panthulu, who she would go on to collaborate frequently on stage and in films. She did her schooling at the Arya Balika school in Bangalore till the 8th grade. She later shifted base to Chennai for doing films.

Career
In the early 1930s, Rajamma was attracted to the stage theatre and entered the field at a time when male actors disguised themselves to play female characters. Rajamma enacted several inspiring roles in dramas such as Samsara Nauke, Gauthama Buddha and Subhadra. In 1935, when one of her stage plays Samsara Nauke was made into a film, she was cast again as the lead actress opposite to Panthulu. They went on to work together in many films for about 20 years. In 1940, she entered Tamil film industry in Chennai with the film Uthama Puthiran. From then on, she became one of the most sought after actresses across all the South Indian film industries. After her marriage, she concentrated mainly on playing motherly roles to the actors whom she had paired as a heroine earlier.

In 1943, Rajamma took her career to another level by producing the Kannada film Radha Ramana directed by Jyothish Sinha that featured herself opposite B. R. Panthulu in the lead. Acclaimed artists such as Balakrishna and G. V. Iyer were introduced through this film. It went on to perform well at the box-office which resulted in her second production venture Makkala Rajya (1960). Though the film was lauded by the critics, the box-office collections soared which made her back off from film production for a long while. However, she went on to star in many box-office blockbusters in both Kannada and Tamil film industries.

Some of the most popular Kannada films featuring Rajamma as a lead actress were Bhakta Prahalada (1942), Rathnagiri Rahasya (1957), School Master (1958), Abba Aa Hudugi (1959) among others.

Awards
 1997-98 - Dr. Rajkumar Lifetime Achievement Award by the Karnataka Government.

Selected filmography

References

External links
 
 Potpourri of titbits about M. V. Rajamma

1921 births
1999 deaths
Actresses from Karnataka
Actresses in Tamil cinema
Actresses in Kannada cinema
Actresses in Telugu cinema
Indian film actresses
Kannada playback singers
20th-century Indian actresses
Tamil Nadu State Film Awards winners
Indian women film producers
Film producers from Karnataka
Kannada film producers
Indian women songwriters
People from Bangalore Rural district
20th-century Indian singers
Women musicians from Karnataka
Singers from Karnataka
20th-century Indian women singers
Film musicians from Karnataka
Businesswomen from Karnataka
20th-century Indian businesspeople
20th-century Indian businesswomen